Neofriseria baungaardiella is a moth of the family Gelechiidae. It was described by Peter Huemer and Ole Karsholt in 1999. It is found in Greece, southern Spain and Portugal.

References

Moths described in 1999
Neofriseria